Possenhofen station is a railway station in the municipality of Pöcking, in Bavaria, Germany. It is located on the Munich–Garmisch-Partenkirchen railway of Deutsche Bahn.

Services
 the following services stop at Possenhofen:

References

External links
 
 Possenhofen layout 
 

Railway stations in Bavaria
Buildings and structures in Starnberg (district)
Munich S-Bahn stations